Rhythm in the House is an album by pianist Hilton Ruiz with special guest Tito Puente recorded in 1998 and released on TropiJazz label, a subsidiary of the Latin music label, RMM.

Reception

The AllMusic review by Stephen Thomas Erlewine called it "a kinetic, entertaining record that proves Latin jazz is not a static form" stating "while not every song has a memorable melody, it's all infectious Latin dance music that proves Ruiz' versatility".

Track listing 
All compositions by Hilton Ruiz.
 "La Conga Libre' – 5:31
 "Old Arrival" – 5:22
 "I'll Be There for You" – 6:30
 "Rhythm in the House" – 4:05
 "Give Her All Your Love" – 4:10
 "Soul Traveler" – 4:40
 "Michael's Mambo" – 6:21

Personnel 
Hilton Ruiz – piano
Tito Puente – timbales, vibraphone
Rubén Rodriguez – bass
Richie Flores – percussion
Other unidentified musicians

References 

Hilton Ruiz albums
1998 albums
RMM Records albums